Mirverdi Kandi (also Romanized as Mīrverdī Kandī; also known as Mehdī Kandī) is a village in Qeshlaq-e Jonubi Rural District, Qeshlaq Dasht District, Bileh Savar County, Ardabil Province, Iran. At the 2006 census, its population was 162, in 32 families.

References 

Towns and villages in Bileh Savar County